Andrei Viktorovich Pavlenko (born 12 July 1986) is a Russian former professional football player.

Club career
He made his Russian Football National League debut for FC Nosta Novotroitsk on 9 April 2008 in a game against FC Dynamo Bryansk.

External links
 

1986 births
Sportspeople from Potsdam
Living people
Russian footballers
FC Spartak Tambov players
FC Tyumen players
FC Luch Vladivostok players
Association football midfielders
Footballers from Brandenburg
FC Chayka Peschanokopskoye players
FC Nosta Novotroitsk players
FC Volga Ulyanovsk players